The Brazilian Cycling Confederation (Portuguese: Confederação Brasileira de Ciclismo, CBC) is the national governing body of cycle racing in Brazil.

The CBC is a member of the UCI and COPACI.

External links
 Brazilian Cycling Confederation official website

National members of the Pan American Cycling Confederation
Cycle racing organizations
 
Sports governing bodies in Brazil